The Pacific West Conference (also known as the PacWest) is a college athletic conference affiliated with the National Collegiate Athletic Association (NCAA) at the Division II level. Member institutions are located in California and Hawaii.

The conference sponsors the following sports: basketball, cross country, golf, soccer, tennis and track & field outdoor for both men and women; baseball for men only; softball and volleyball for women only. The newest PacWest sports are men's tennis and women's golf, both added in 2012–13.

History

Formation

The PacWest was formed in 1992 when the Great Northwest Conference (a men's conference) merged with the Continental Divide Conference (a women's conference containing some of the same members), in response to the departures of several members and new NCAA legislation requiring conferences to have at least six members. In addition, some Hawai'i-based colleges joined the new conference.

At one point the conference expanded to 16 members, but in 2001, member schools from Washington, Alaska, California, and Oregon left to form the new Great Northwest Athletic Conference.

With the departure of the final two mainland members, Montana State University–Billings and Western New Mexico University, to join the Heartland Conference in 2005, the four Hawai'i universities played one season as “independents” after receiving a waiver from the NCAA to keep the conference in name, while searching for new members, because in order to be eligible for conference membership in the NCAA, a conference must consist of a minimum of six member institutions who sponsor at least ten sports, with two team sports for each gender.

New PacWest Conference
To comply with conference membership regulations, Hawai'i Pacific (HPU), Chaminade, BYU–Hawai'i and Hawai'i–Hilo added new sports to their programs. In July 2005, the Pacific West Conference voted to admit Notre Dame de Namur University as a provisional member, as it moved from the NAIA to the NCAA Division II. Grand Canyon University, formerly an NCAA D-II Independent, also joined the conference, returning the Pacific West Conference to full conference status with six members. Dixie State College of Utah joined the conference for the 2007–08 season.1 In 2008, it was announced that Academy of Art University would join the conference in the 2009–10 season as the conference's 8th member. In 2009 it was announced that Dominican University of California would join the conference in the 2009–10 season as the conference's 9th member. That same year, the conference announced it would sponsor baseball as its 11th sport, with Hawai'i Pacific University, University of Hawai'i–Hilo, Dixie State College of Utah (now Utah Tech University), and Grand Canyon University competing on a Division II level.

Recent expansion and contraction
The conference began expansion in 2010 when the PacWest invited California Baptist University, from the NAIA's Golden State Athletic Conference (GSAC) to join the conference beginning with the 2011–12 school year. On June 1, 2011, the conference announced the additions of Azusa Pacific University, Fresno Pacific University and Point Loma Nazarene University, all members of the GSAC, which began Pacific West Conference play during the 2012–13 season. Holy Names University was also added to the PacWest in 2011, but did not begin the NCAA Division II membership process from the NAIA until July 13, 2012. As part of the transition process from NAIA to NCAA Holy Names remained ineligible for NCAA postseason play through 2015–16. On November 27, 2012, Grand Canyon announced it would leave the PacWest after the 2012–13 school year to accept an invitation to join the Division I Western Athletic Conference. In July 2016, it was announced that Biola University would join the PacWest for the 2017–18 season. In October 2016, Dixie State announced that it would transition from the PacWest to the Rocky Mountain Athletic Conference after the 2017–18 school year. On January 13, 2017, California Baptist announced that it will leave the PacWest in favor of moving up to NCAA Division I. On March 23, 2020, Notre Dame de Namur announced the cessation of all its athletics after the 2019–20 school year.

Chronological timeline
 1992 - The Pacific West Conference (PacWest) was founded due to a merger of the men's sports-only Great Northwest Conference and the women's sports-only Continental Divide Conference (which contained some of the same members). Charter members included the University of Alaska at Anchorage, the University of Alaska at Fairbanks, Chaminade University of Honolulu, Grand Canyon University, the University of Hawaiʻi at Hilo, Montana State University at Billings, Portland State University (only for women's sports) and Seattle Pacific University, effective beginning the 1992-93 academic year.
 1994 - Grand Canyon left the PacWest to join the California Collegiate Athletic Association (CCAA), effective after the 1993-94 academic year.
 1996 - Portland State's women's sports left the PacWest to fully align with their men's sports to join the Division I ranks of the National Collegiate Athletic Association (NCAA) and the Big Sky Conference, effective after the 1995-96 academic year.
 1998 - Brigham Young University–Hawai'i, Central Washington University, Hawai'i Pacific University, Humboldt State University, Saint Martin's University, Western Oregon University, Western New Mexico University and Western Washington University joined the PacWest, effective in the 1998-99 academic year.
 1999 - Northwest Nazarene University and Seattle University joined the PacWest, effective in the 1999-2000 academic year.
 2001 - Alaska–Anchorage, Alaska–Fairbanks, Central Washington, Humboldt State, Northwest Nazarene, Saint Martin's, Seattle, Seattle Pacific, Western Oregon and Western Washington left the PacWest to form the Great Northwest Athletic Conference (GNAC), effective after the 2000-01 academic year.
 2005 - Montana State–Billings and Western New Mexico left the PacWest to join the Heartland Conference, effective after the 2004-05 academic year.
 2005 - Notre Dame de Namur University joined the PacWest as a provisional full member (along with Grand Canyon re-joining), effective in the 2005-06 academic year.
 2007 - Dixie State University joined the PacWest, effective in the 2007-08 academic year.
 2009 - Academy of Art University and Dominican University of California joined the PacWest, effective in the 2009-10 academic year.
 2011 - California Baptist University (Cal Baptist) joined the PacWest, effective in the 2011-12 academic year.
 2012 - Azusa Pacific University, Fresno Pacific University, Holy Names University and Point Loma Nazarene University joined the PacWest, effective in the 2012-13 academic year.
 2013 - Grand Canyon left the PacWest to join the NCAA Division I ranks and the Western Athletic Conference (WAC), effective after the 2012-13 academic year.
 2013 - Sonoma State University joined the PacWest as an affiliate member for men's and women's tennis, effective in the 2014 spring season (2013-14 academic year).
 2014 - California State University, Los Angeles and California State University, Stanislaus joined the PacWest as affiliate members for women's tennis, effective in the 2014 spring season (2013-14 academic year).
 2015 - Concordia University Irvine joined the PacWest, effective in the 2015-16 academic year.
 2017 - BYU–Hawaii left the PacWest as the school announced that it would discontinue its athletic program, effective after the 2016-17 academic year.
 2017 - Biola University joined the PacWest, effective in the 2017-18 academic year.
 2018 - Two institutions left the PacWest to join their respective new home primary conferences: Dixie State to join the Rocky Mountain Athletic Conference (RMAC), and Cal Baptist to join the NCAA Division I ranks and the WAC, both effective after the 2017-18 academic year.
 2020 - Notre Dame de Namur left the PacWest as the school announced that it would discontinue its athletic program, effective after the 2019-20 academic year.
 2022 - Westmont College joined the PacWest, effective in the 2023-24 academic year.
 2022 - Holy Names announced it would discontinue its athletic program following the 2022-23 season, making it their last in the PacWest.
 2022 - Menlo College pending approval to join the NCAA will join the PacWest, effective for the 2023-24 academic year.
 2023 - Jessup University pending approval to join The NCAA will join the PacWest, effective for the 2023-24 academic year.

Member schools

Current members
The PacWest currently has 11 full members, all but one are private schools:

 Holy Names will drop their entire athletic department following the 2022-23 athletics season.

Future members

Affiliate members
The PacWest currently has two affiliate members, both are public schools:

Former members
The PacWest had 18 former full members, all but seven were public schools:

Notes

Former affiliate members
The PacWest had one former affiliate member, which was also a public school:

Membership timeline

National championships

Azusa Pacific
 Women's Outdoor Track & Field (2021)

BYU–Hawai'i
 Men's Tennis (2002, 2003)
 Women's Tennis (1999, 2000, 2002, 2003, 2004, 2006, 2007)
 Women's Volleyball (1999, 2002)

Grand Canyon
 Men's Soccer (1996)
 Men's Indoor Track & Field (2012)

Hawai'i Pacific
 Women's Volleyball (1998, 2000)
 Softball (2010)
 Men's Tennis (2016)

Academy of Art
 Women's Outdoor Track & Field (2013)

Sports

Men's sponsored sports by school

Women's sponsored sports by school

Other sponsored sports by school

Conference facilities

References

External links